Mars Station may refer to:

Train stations
 Gare du Champ de Mars, Paris, France (Mars Field train station)
 Gare de Port-Saint-Père-Saint-Mars, the Saint-Mars station in France
 Mars Station, Pennsylvania, Mars, Pennsylvania, US
 Champ-de-Mars station (Montreal Metro), Quebec, Canada (Mars Field subway station)
 Mars station (Illinois), Chicago, Illinois, US

Planet Mars
 Exploration of Mars, for robotic planet Mars stations
 Colonization of Mars, for proposed Mars space stations and colony stations
 List of Mars analogs, for Mars-analogue stations on Earth
 Mars Analogue Research Station Program, an Earth station analogue of a Mars station from The Mars Society

See also
 Mars (disambiguation)